William Manger is an American sound editor.

William Manger (or variants) may also refer to:

Bill Manger (1900–1958), Australian rules football player
William M. Manger, Jr., in United States House of Representatives elections, 2004
William Manger (general), American Secretary General of the Organization of American States
William Manger (1865–1928), Co-founder of the Manger Hotels